Angus MacInnes (born 27 October 1947) is a Canadian actor.  He is most famous for his role as Jon "Dutch" Vander in Star Wars, and as former hockey great Jean "Rosey" LaRose in the comedy Strange Brew. He also appeared in Witness as a corrupt policeman, as a gangster seeking stolen cocaine in Atlantic City, and he is currently starring in BBC Scotland soap River City as Sonny.

Filmography

Film
 1975 Rollerball as Jonathan's Guard (uncredited)
 1977 Star Wars as Jon "Dutch" Vander (Gold Leader)
 1978 Force 10 From Navarone as Lieutenant Doug Reynolds
 1980 Nothing Personal as Military Policeman #2
 1980 Atlantic City as Vinnie
 1980 Superman II as The Warden
 1981 Dirty Tricks as FBI Agent Jones
 1981 Outland as Hughes
 1982 If You Could See What I Hear as Policeman
 1982 Murder by Phone as Laboratory Guard
 1982 The Sender as Sheriff Prouty
 1983 Strange Brew as Jean LaRose
 1983  Spasms as Duncan Tyrone
 1984 Best Revenge as Wayne
 1985 Witness as "Fergie" 
 1986 Half Moon Street as Bill Rafferty
 1988 Hellbound: Hellraiser II as Detective Bronson
 1988 Honor Bound as Jessup
 1989 Gross Anatomy as Dean Torrence
 1990 The Krays as Palendri
 1992 Spies Inc. as Vic
 1995 Judge Dredd as Council Judge Gerald Silver
 1999 Eyes Wide Shut as Gateman #1
 1999 Operation Delta Force 4: Deep Fault as Professor Walter Hill
 2000 Rhythm & Blues as Bad Daddy
 2001 Enigma as Commander Hammerbeck
 2001 The 51st State as "Pudsey" Smith, The Chemist
 2002 Amen. as Tittman
 2004 Hellboy as Sergeant Whitman
 2005 The Jacket as Judge
 2006 The Black Dahlia as Captain John Tierney (credited as Angus MacInnis)
 2007 Flight of Fury as General Tom Barnes
 2007 Dach as Security Guard
 2013 Captain Phillips as Maersk Alabama Crew 
 2015 Elstree 1976 as himself
 2016 Rogue One: A Star Wars Story as Gold Leader Jon "Dutch" Vander (archive footage with newly recorded audio)

Television
 Space: 1999 (1977) as Jelto (Season 2, episode Devil's Planet)
 The Littlest Hobo (aired March 27th, 1980) as a henchman (Season 1, episode 20, "Escape")
 The New Statesman (1988) as captain Hirsch (Season 1, episode 5)
 Space Island One (1998) as Lieutenant Commander Walter B. Shannon
 Vikings (2013) as Tostig

References

External links
 
 Northern Stars profile

1947 births
Canadian male film actors
Canadian male television actors
Canadian male voice actors
Living people
Male actors from Windsor, Ontario